Travkin is a Russian family name, derived from the word travka, a diminutive for trava, 'grass'. Its feminine counterpart is Travkina. Notable people with the name include:

Nikolay Travkin, Russian politician
Alexei Travkin, Russian rugby player
Ivan Travkin, Soviet submarine commander

Russian-language surnames